Ambajogai  is a municipal council, Tehsil and subdivision in Beed district in the state of Maharashtra, India.   Ambajogai is known as cultural capital of Marathwada.

The town is named as change 1962 Ambajogai after goddess Ambabai - Yogeshwari whose heritage temple is located here and are visited by people all over from Maharashtra, largely from the Konkan region. The town has many heritage places and this township is known as the cultural capital of the Marathwada region. The town has other heritage temples like Sakleshwar and 12 Khambhi temple, Kholeshwar mandir, Mukundraj cave and Dasopant Swami Samadhi, Mukundraj samadhi, Kashivishwanath, Amruteshwar. There is an ancient cave called Shivleni Caves (Hattikhana) or Jogai Mandap declared as a heritage point (Archaeological sites in Maharashtra), where Lord Shankar, Nandi and Elephants are carved in stone. Shiva, Bramha, and Vishnu is also in carved in Stone.

History 
The town has been a cultural center in the region from the ancient times. The Yogeshwari (Jogai)Temple, Kholeshwar Temple and Barakhambi temples hints the cultural prosperity of the town dating back to 10th century AD.

The town was under the regime of Nizam of Hyderabad before the accession of Hyderabad state to the dominion of India. Many heritage sites and temples were harmed during this period. It was a military base of the Hyderabad state army. The stable of the horses of the cavalry of the Hyderabad army was later turned into a hospital and medical college which later was named as Swami Ramanand Teerth Rural Medical College.

Demographics
 India census, Ambajogai had a population of 74,844. Males constitute 52% of the population and females 48%. Ambajogai has an average literacy rate of 85.89%, higher than the national average of 74.04%; with 91.58% of the males and 79.88% of females literate. 12% of the population is under 6 years of age.

References

External links 
 

Cities and towns in Beed district
Archaeological sites in Maharashtra
Talukas in Maharashtra